A. D. Williams (November 21, 1933 – September 18, 2019) was an American football end in the National Football League who played for the Green Bay Packers,  the Cleveland Browns, and the Minnesota Vikings.  Williams was drafted in the third round of the 1956 NFL Draft out of University of the Pacific.  He played for 3 years in the NFL, and retired in 1961.

References

External links
 A. D. Williams Quotes on Quotes Parade

1933 births
Sportspeople from Little Rock, Arkansas
American football tight ends
Santa Monica Corsairs football players
Pacific Tigers football players
Cleveland Browns players
Green Bay Packers players
Minnesota Vikings players
Living people